East Kerry may refer to:
East Kerry GAA, board of the Gaelic Athletic Association 
East Kerry (UK Parliament constituency)